Boom TV (initially operated by DTH Television Group) was a Romanian telecommunications company, which mainly offered satellite television. The program packages offered by Boom were made to satisfy the needs of the viewers by selecting the programs and offering exclusive shows according to the presentation from the launching of Boom. Due to excessive debt, the parent company (DTH Television Gro) filled for insolvency in May 2010 and the Boom network was acquired by Romtelecom in March 2011.

Milestones
 21 December 2005: The first tests on Amos satellite for this operator.
 April 2006: Official sources announce the launching at the beginning of May 2006.
 27 April 2006: The first official announcement regarding the program offered by Boom TV
 4 May 2006: The official launching of the digital program Boom TV
 18 February 2007: Kanal D is available in the Boom TV package.
 25 December 2020: The first tests on Hellas Sat satellite for this operator.

References

External links
 Boom Extrasatelit

Direct broadcast satellite services
Television companies of Romania
Companies based in Bucharest